Temple Bruer Preceptory  is a historic building in the civil parish of Temple Bruer with Temple High Grange, North Kesteven, Lincolnshire, England. It is one of the few Knights Templar sites left in England where any ruins remain standing. Its name comes from its Templar ownership and its position in the middle of the Lincoln Heath, bruyère (heather) from the French language current at the time. It was founded in the period 1150 to 1160 and the order was dissolved in 1312. The site has been excavated twice, firstly by the Rev Dr. G. Oliver, the rector of Scopwick in 1832–3, and in 1908 by Sir William St John Hope.

Foundation and history
The preceptory of Temple Bruer was founded late in the reign of Henry II (1154–89), This date is based on the grant of a market by Henry II to William of Ashby de la Launde, who was admitted soon afterwards into the fraternity of the preceptory, He increased the original endowment before his death. Other benefactors were Maud de Cauz, John d'Eyncourt, Robert of Everingham, William de Vescy, Gilbert of Ghent. The house seems to have been of considerable size and importance; the brethren were allowed to crenellate the great gate in 1306
Following the suppression of the order of Knights Templar in France, Edward II followed in 1308 by sending John de Cormel, the sheriff of Lincolnshire, with 12 knights and their forces to arrest the Templars at Temple Bruer. These included William de More, the Preceptor and Grand Master of the order in England. For a time they were held in the Clasketgate in Lincoln before being sent to the Tower of London . The order was totally suppressed by Pope Clement V in 1312, with the instruction that the Templar properties were to be transferred to the Knights Hospitallers. It took until the 1330s for the Hospitallers to recover the estates from the English King.

Following the death of Sir John Babington in 1534, Sir Giles Russell was made commander at Temple Bruer. His letters show that he did not reside at Temple Bruer; but finding that the house was in a ruinous condition he made some effort to get it repaired and put it in a better condition. In 1539 Russell was made turcopolier, of the Order and being at the time in Malta, he probably saw little of his commandery before its dissolution in 1541.

The lands of the preceptory
The original endowment included lands in Ashby de la Launde, with the parish church and pasturage for sheep; lands and church at Rowston, Heckington, Burton, and were granted by benefactors of the twelfth and thirteenth centuries. In 1338 the revenue of the house was £177 7s. 7d., including the churches of Ashby and Rowston, the free chapel of Bruere, with lands at Bruere, Rowston, Wellingore, Ashby de la Launde, Brauncewell, and North Kirkby; the expenses were £84 0s. 2d. The clear value of the house at the dissolution was £16 19s. 10¾d., including the bailiwick of South Witham and the farm of half the rectory and the grange of Holme in Heckington, with perquisites of a court.

Maurice Beresford and John Hurst listed Bruer as a Deserted Medieval Village in their definitive work. This lay to the south in a dry valley. An aerial photograph suggests that it was a walled enclosure with a gatehouse.

Remaining site

The ruin consists of the intact square south tower of the temple church, one of two added to the original structure during the Templars' tenure, north and south of the chancel or presbytery. The Preceptory Tower is currently in the care of Heritage Lincolnshire
The farmhouse which stands to the south of the tower was built in the 1840s for Charles Chaplin of Blankney Hall. It is likely that it was designed by the architect William Adams Nicholson, who acted as estate architect for Charles Chaplin.

Excavations

1833 excavations

In 1833 Rev. Dr. Oliver was allowed to excavate the site by Charles Chaplin of Blankney Hall, who had recently acquired the Temple Bruer estates. Dr Oliver remarks: The present proprietor, Charles Chaplin Esq. of Blankney, has evinced a laudable anxiety to preserve the present Tower from ruin, by the introduction of a new roof, and by securing the cracks and fissures in the walls. 
Dr Oliver's account of his excavations paints a lurid account of the discoveries and would appear to be supporting a justification for the charges which were brought against the Lincolnshire Knights Templars who were brought to trail first in Lincoln in November 1309 and later in London in 1310. Subsequent excavation in 1908 showed that Dr Oliver's excavation had misinterpreted the features of the Preceptory and it is possible that Dr Oliver may have encountered skeletons from a Charnel house in his excavations. It was also shown that part of the passage system described by Oliver was a crypt and the horrible cavern, the stones of which  had assumed the colour of brick was a medieval oven structure1908 excavations
In 1908 William St John Hope, together with Col. Reeve of Leadenham Hall, and with the permission of Lord Londesborough, the owner, undertook extensive excavations on the site. Hope was a leading medieval archaeologist of the period and Assistant Secretary of the Society of Antiquaries.

Hope appears to have identified part of the precinct wall to the west of the church as that which was authorised by the 1306 licence to crenellate, which referred to a certain part and strong gate and which was noted in the 1338 Extent as a curtilagio. He also discovered a number of slight structures the south wall of the precinct, which were probably the henhouse and stables mentioned in the Extent. A larger building lay to the south of the church. This was 36m long and 11.5m wide, and was probably a barn. Hope was able to distinguish four phases of the development of the Preceptory. The first phase was the church with a round nave, about 15m in diameter, with a ring of eight columns, which distinguished a central area from an outer aisle. To the east was a rectangular presbytery of two bays measuring about 8m by 4m, with an apse at the east end. Below this lay a crypt, which may be the feature shown in the bottom left-hand corner of Samuel Buck 1726 engraving of the Preceptory. No clear indication was found of the fenestration except at the east end of the apse; and there was no clear point of access to the nave, though this may have lain on the north side where outside several rock cut graves into the local limestone, were recorded. This first phase appears to equate with the initial foundation of the Preceptory in the mid-12th century.

 
The second phase dates from the later 12th century. A porch was constructed at the west end. The apse was removed and the presbytery extended two further bays to the east. This was followed by a third phase when towers were added to either side of the extended presbytery. A similar arrangement was adopted at the nearby Aslackby Preceptory. The northern tower survived as foundations, while the southern tower remains to its full height. Access to the ground floor of the tower is from the north and would formerly communicated into the presbytery. To the east of the door are the remains of a double piscina which would have served the high altar. Above the door is a corbel that supported the rib vault of the presbytery roof; while to the right is the triple-shafted respond of the south side of the chancel arch. The ground floor room of the tower is a rib-vaulted chamber with windows in three sides. This room has an impressive blind arcade on its west and south sides, with a stone bench beneath. This bench has had incorporated a double sedilia and piscina. There is a further chamber above, reached by a spiral staircase. The fourth or final phase of building was the addition, revealed as foundations on the south side, of a chapel. The roof line of this chapel can be clearly seen on the west face of the standing tower. The photographs published by Hope show that ruinous elements of the upper parts of the tower were extensively repaired at a later date.

Gallery

See also
Other Templar preceptories in Lincolnshire
Aslackby Preceptory, Kesteven
Eagle, Kesteven
Temple Bruer Preceptory
Witham Preceptory, Kesteven
Willoughton Preceptory, Lindsey

Templar 'camera' and granges in Lincolnshire
Bottesford, Lindsey . Cell of Willougton()
Temple Belwood, Belton, North Lincolnshire
Grantham Angel and Royal
Gainsborough, Lincolnshire
Great Limber, Lindsey
Horkstow, Lindsey Cell of Willoughton.
Mere, Branston and Mere. Probably a grange of Willoughton.

References

Bibliography
Antram N (revised), Pevsner N & Harris J, (1989), The Buildings of England: Lincolnshire, Yale University Press. 
Charles G. Addison The History of the Knights Templars (1997) 
Larking, L B. and Kemble, J. M (1857), The Knights Hospitallers in England: Being a Report of the Prior Philip de Thame to the Grand Master Elyan de Villanova for A.D. 1338 Camden Society, pp.153-156
Mills, D. The Knights Templar in Kesteven North Kesteven District Council (c.1990)
Oliver G. Rev.Dr.(1843) Temple Bruer and its Knights, in A selection of Papers relative to the County of Lincoln read before the Lincolnshire Topographical Society 1841,1842. pp. 67–90, W & B Brooke, High Street, Lincoln. 
Sister Elspeth (1906) in Page, William,(ed). A History of the County of Lincoln Volume 2. Victoria County History. pp. 210–213 Houses of Knights Templars: Willoughton, Eagle, Aslackby, South Witham and Temple Bruer.
St John Hope, W.H. (1908) The Round Church of the Knights Templar at Temple Bruer, Lincolnshire in Archaeologia, LXL, 177–198 
White, A.The Knights Templar of at Temple Bruer and Aslackby', Lincolnshire Museums Archaeology Series No.25. (1981)

External links

Hospitaller Archaeology 
Historic England Scheduling details 
British Listed Buildings 
Heritage Lincolnshire Video reconstruction of the Preceptory 
Heritage Lincolnshire site information 

History of Lincolnshire
Churches in Lincolnshire
Monasteries in Lincolnshire
North Kesteven District
England in the High Middle Ages
Medieval sites in England
Knights Templar
Villages in Lincolnshire
1150s establishments in England
1312 disestablishments
1310s disestablishments in Europe